ECQ may refer to:

 Enhanced community quarantine
 Enhanced community quarantine in Luzon
 UEFA European Championship qualifying
 Ex contradictione quodlibet, in logic
 Electoral Commission of Queensland, Australia